Eden, Illinois may refer to the following places in the U.S. state of Illinois:
Eden, Peoria County, Illinois
Eden, Randolph County, Illinois